Wide-Eyed and Ignorant is the fourth album by the Irish rock band A House, released in 1994. It contains the single "Here Come the Good Times", which was A House's only entry in the UK Top 40, at number 37. "Everything I Am" includes a spoken word section.

Critical reception

Entertainment Weekly determined that "the catchiest choruses on the fourth album by these brassy Irish folk-popsters raise gooseflesh the way the Pogues and Violent Femmes could in their prime." The Guardian opined that the band's "gift for strong melodies and playful lyrics ... is constantly undermined by tuneless vocals." The Hamilton Spectator wrote: "A bright mixture of folk-based pop and rolling rhythms, spiced with Dave Couse's sardonic vocals, A House always provides an interesting twist on human yearning."

Track listing

Alternative track listing (U.S.)
Released in 1995 with a different cover.
 "The Strong and the Silent" (3:25)
 "She Keeps Me Humble" (3:58)
 "Why Me?" (3:22)
 "Curious" (3:46)
 "Make Me Proud" (3:24)
 "Everything I Am" (3:39)
 "Picture A House" (1:28)
 This is the same track as "Intro" on the UK release.
 "Here Come the Good Times" (3:36)
 "The Comedy Is Over" (3:37)
 "Because You Love Me" (2:54)
 "Spinster" (3:19)
 "These Things" (2:38)

Personnel

 Fergal Bunbury - guitar
 Dave Couse - vocals, guitar 
 Dave Dawson - drums 
 Martin Healy - bass
 Susan Kavanagh - backing vocals 
 David Morrissey - keyboards, backing vocals 
 Edwyn Collins - production, Spanish guitar, harmonica, keyboards

References

1994 albums
A House albums
MCA Records albums
Radioactive Records albums
Parlophone albums
Setanta Records albums